Seco Creek, is a tributary stream of the Hondo Creek, in Frio County, Texas.  Named Rio Seco (Seco, the Spanish word for "dry,") in 1689 by Captain Alonso De León, governor of Coahuila, when his expedition crossed the creek.

Seco Creek has its source five miles north of Sentry Mountain and Farm Road 470 in southwestern Bandera County.  Its course runs southeast for sixty-six miles through Bandera, Uvalde, Frio and Medina Counties.  Its mouth at its confluence with Hondo Creek, is seven miles west of Moore in Frio County.

History
Seco Creek was a watering place for travelers on the San Antonio-El Paso Road including the stagecoach lines like the San Antonio-El Paso Mail and San Antonio-San Diego Mail Line.

See also
List of rivers of Texas

References

Rivers of Texas
Rivers of Bandera County, Texas
Rivers of Uvalde County, Texas
Bodies of water of Frio County, Texas
Bodies of water of Medina County, Texas
San Antonio–El Paso Road
San Antonio–San Diego Mail Line
Stagecoach stops in the United States